The Cathedral Church of the Holy Spirit, Guildford, commonly known as Guildford Cathedral, is the Anglican cathedral at Guildford, Surrey, England. Richard Onslow donated the first  of land on which the cathedral stands, with Viscount Bennett, a former Prime Minister of Canada, purchasing the remaining land and donating it to the cathedral in 1947. Designed by Edward Maufe and built between 1936 and 1961, it is the seat of the Bishop of Guildford.

Construction
The Diocese of Guildford was created in 1927, covering most of Surrey. Guildford's restored Georgian Holy Trinity Church served as pro-cathedral, but was considered too small to become the cathedral.

In 1932, a design competition was held, with a brief that the construction costs should be £250,000. 183 architects took part, from whom the Cathedral Committee chose Edward Maufe (later Sir Edward Maufe) as its architect.

In 1933, Richard Onslow, 5th Earl of Onslow donated land at the top of Stag Hill as a site for the cathedral.

The foundation stone was laid by Cosmo Lang, Archbishop of Canterbury, in 1936, but work was suspended in 1939 due to the Second World War.

In 1947, Viscount Bennett, former prime minister of Canada, bought the land surrounding Stag Hill, as a memorial to Canadian soldiers who were billeted in the area during the Second World War.

In 1948, work recommenced on building new roofs and the base of the tower, but post-war building restrictions meant that building was not able to fully resume until 1952, after the appointment of Walter Boulton as Provost. At that point, it was already clear that £250,000 originally raised to build the cathedral was hopelessly inadequate. The Cathedral Committee, and its formidable secretary, Miss Eleanora Iredale, launched the 'Buy-a Brick' campaign in 1952. Between 1952 and 1961 more than 200,000 people paid 2s 6d to sign their name, or the name of another person on a brick. Elizabeth II and Prince Philip both signed bricks, which are on display inside the cathedral, along with bricks signed by other members of the Royal Family. 

Before the war, the bricks themselves had been made by Guildford Brick Works at the bottom of Stag Hill, from the clay removed during the installation of 778 piles, driven  into the hill. After the war, the brickworks ceased to trade, and bricks were then bought from a brickmakers in Beare Green, Sussex. There is a slight colour variation between the local bricks (forming the eastern end of the cathedral) and the Sussex bricks, forming the western end, tower, garths and Lady Chapel.

The building was consecrated in the presence of Her Majesty Queen Elizabeth on 17 May 1961. The building was finally completed in 1965.

Location
Where to put the cathedral for the new diocese of Guildford was a vexing question until Richard, Lord Onslow donated  atop Stag Hill — so named because the Kings of England used to hunt there. Its solid red brick outline is visible for miles around. Whilst in 1932 this was far outside the town of Guildford, the growth since then has already begun to wrap around the cathedral to the west and south. Guildford Cathedral shares Stag Hill with the main campus of the University of Surrey.

Description

Writing in 1932, Maufe said: ‘The ideal has been to produce a design, definitely of our own time, yet in the line of the great English Cathedrals; to build anew on tradition, to rely on proportion, mass, volume and line rather than on elaboration and ornament.' Pevsner Architectural Guides described the building as 'sweet-tempered, undramatic Curvilinear Gothic', and the interior as 'noble and subtle.'

Maufe was influenced by the Continental cathedrals, notably Albi Cathedral in France, and favoured clean modern design in a Gothic Revival style. It is said that the design for Guildford Cathedral in turn influenced the design of Auckland Cathedral in New Zealand.

The bells were augmented to 12 with two Whitechapel trebles in 1975. The largest bell weighs 30cwt (just over 1.5 tonnes) and is tuned to the key of D. At the top of the tower stands a  gilded angel, which turns in the wind. Inside, the cathedral appears to be filled with light, with pale Somerset limestone pillars and white Italian marble floors. It is a Grade II* listed building.

The angel on the top of the tower was given in memory of Sgt. Reginald Adgey-Edgar of the Intelligence Corps, who died on active service in 1944 during World War II. It was designed by William Pickford and created by four silversmiths, before being positioned in Spring 1963. The supporting pole for the angel houses mobile phone antennas.

The wooden cross which stands outside the eastern end of the cathedral was erected in 1933 before construction work began in order to mark the site of the new cathedral. Known as the Ganges Cross, it is made from timbers of Burma teak from the battleship . The ship's emblem — an elephant — is embedded in the wood.

Sir Edward Maufe's wife, Lady Prudence Maufe – an internal designer, Director of Heal and Sons Ltd. and noted broderer – was instrumental in the design of the textiles within the cathedral. Unusually, Maufe's contract included complete control over the internal fittings and colour scheme of the cathedral. This colour scheme references Guildford's wool trade past, notably the blue colour that Guildford wool was famous for. The 1,447 kneelers, using a combination of standard and individual designs, were each reviewed and approved by Lady Maufe and her committee. They were made by over 400 individuals, mainly from the British Isles, but including people from other countries, such as Australia and New Zealand. Whilst most were made during the late 1950s and early 1960s, there are examples dating back to the late 1930s, and they collectively form a fascinating record of society and life at that time.

20th-century sculptors and artists are well represented at Guildford Cathedral, notably Eric Gill, Vernon Hill, Mary Spencer Watson, Dennis Huntley, Alan Collins and local artists John Cobbett and Douglas Stephen. Charles Gurrey created a series of sculptures above the West Front, to mark the Millennium, whilst Canadian sculptor Nicholas Thompson completed a sculpture of a WWI mother and child in 2016.

There are three side chapels. The Children's Chapel is dedicated to children who have died, and holds a book of remembrance for children of any age. The Chapel of the Queen's Royal Surrey Regiment holds the regimental colours and was dedicated in 1959 to the Honour of King Charles the Martyr. The Queen's Royal Regiment was founded in 1661 as the Tangiers Regiment on the marriage of King Charles II and Catherine of Braganza. The Lady Chapel was built using funds donated by the Canadian people, in recognition of the support for Canadian troops stationed in the area during both world wars. It contains a figure of the Madonna and Child, carved in lignum vitae by Douglas Stephen, the then manager of Barclays Bank, Chelsea. The altar and altar rails were originally used in the chapel in the crypt, the place of worship for the original parish, during the construction of the cathedral. The crypt chapel is now used as the choir room.

Stained glass

Guildford cathedral contains fewer stained glass windows than average, having predominantly a clear glazing scheme (using opaque glass to soften the light) to complement the modernist architectural style of the building. However it includes works by Moira Forsyth, William Wilson, James Powell and Sons, Ninian Comper and Lawrence Lee.

Carved glass 

The cathedral has etched glass works by New Zealand-born artist John Hutton.  One set adorns the panel at the west entrance; the other is above the internal doors to the south porch. Hutton achieved particular acclaim for his work at Coventry Cathedral, and he worked on both Coventry and Guildford Cathedrals at the same time.

Dean and Cathedral Clergy
As of 30 May 2019:
Dean — Dianna Gwilliams (since 15 September 2013 installation)
Sub-Dean (SSM) — Stuart Beake (canon residentiary since 2010)
Residentiary Canon with responsibility for Public Engagement and Pastoral Care - Chris Hollingshurst (since 24 January 2021)
Priest Vicar- Mavis Wilson (SSM)
Anglican Chaplain to the University of Surrey and Priest Vicar - Duncan Myers (from January 2020)

Music

Organ
The cathedral organ was installed in 1961 by the Liverpool firm of Rushworth and Dreaper. It is a reconstruction of an organ dating from c. 1866, previously in the Rosse Street Baptist Church in Shipley, West Yorkshire. During the cathedral's renovation in 2015 to 2017, the organ was dismantled and refurbished. There are approximately 4,600 pipes across both the main and positive organs.

Organists
 
Organists at Guildford Cathedral have included the composer Philip Moore. Katherine Dienes-Williams became the first female Organist and Master of the Choristers in an English Anglican Cathedral in January 2008.

See also 
Exterior sculpture of Guildford Cathedral
List of cathedrals in the United Kingdom

References

External links

 Official website
 A history of the choristers of Guildford Cathedral
 Seeds of Hope Children's Garden (Archived May 2019)

Churches completed in 1961
20th-century Church of England church buildings
Tourist attractions in Surrey
Anglican cathedrals in England
Diocese of Guildford
Church of England church buildings in Surrey
Buildings and structures in Guildford
Modern architecture in the United Kingdom
Grade II* listed churches in Surrey
Art Deco architecture in England